Times of Our Lives is the fourteenth studio album by American singer-songwriter Judy Collins, released in February 1982 by Elektra Records. It peaked at No. 190 on the Billboard Pop Albums charts. In 1981, prior to the album's release, Collins appeared on the CBS soap opera Guiding Light, performing two songs from the (then) forthcoming album: "Great Expectations" and "It's Gonna Be One of Those Nights".

The single of "Memory" by Andrew Lloyd Webber from the Broadway musical Cats was the earliest released version of the song by a singer (apart from its Broadway Cast Album).  It was quickly followed by another version by Barbra Streisand.

Track listing
Side one
"Great Expectations" (Hugh Prestwood) – 3:54
"The Rest of Your Life" (Judy Collins) – 4:43
"Grandaddy" (Collins) – 3:24
"It's Gonna Be One of Those Nights" (Hugh Prestwood) – 3:38
"Memory" (T. S. Eliot, Andrew Lloyd Webber, Trevor Nunn) – 4:13

Side two
"Sun Son" (Anna McGarrigle) – 4:18
"Mama Mama" (Collins) – 3:38
"Drink a Round to Ireland" (Hugh Prestwood) – 3:48
"Angel on My Side" (Collins) – 4:31
"Don't Say Goodbye Love" (Collins) – 4:39

Personnel
 Judy Collins – vocals, guitar, piano; arrangement and conductor on "Don't Say Goodbye Love"
 Hugh McCracken – acoustic and electric guitar, mandolin
 Steve Khan – electric guitar
 Tony Levin – bass guitar
 Randy Kerber – piano, Fender Rhodes electric piano, Fender Prophet, CS80 and Omni synthesizer, Omni strings
 Vinnie Colaiuta – drums
 Jimmy Madison – drums
 Rubens Bassini – percussion, congas
 Richard Rimbaugh – drums, tabla, tambourine, finger cymbals
 George Marge – oboe
 Dominic Cortese – accordion
 Margaret Ross – harp
 Max Pollikoff – violin
 Eddie Daniels – alto saxophone
 Bill Keith – banjo
 Dick Hyman – celesta, piano
 Ken Bichel – piano
 Lew Hahn – Casiotone MT30
 Gordon Grody, Shelton Becton, Ula Hedwig – backing vocals
 Cengiz Yaltkaya – arrangement and conductor on "The Rest of Your Lives", "Sun Son", "Mama Mama" and "Angel On My Side"
 Jonathan Tunick – arrangement and conductor on "Grandaddy" and "Drink a Round to Ireland"
 Arif Mardin – arrangement and conductor on "It's Gonna Be One of Those Nights"
 William David Brohn – arrangement and conductor on "Memory"
 David Nadien – concertmaster

Technical
 Arif Mardin – executive producer
 Jim Houghton – photography

Charts

References

External links
 

Judy Collins albums
1982 albums
Albums arranged by Arif Mardin
Elektra Records albums